The Taça Ioduran, was the third interstate clubs competition realized in Brazil, after Taça Salutaris (1911), and Taça dos Campeões Estaduais (1913 and 1914). The tournament consists of the clash between São Paulo champions and Rio de Janeiro champions.

In two of the three editions of the competition, the result was decided by W/O. This was due to the fact that CA Paulistano refused to face America in 1917 and Fluminense in 1919. The Ioduran Cup was referred to in the press as "Brazilian Foot-Ball Championship", as it brought together the two most developed centers of the sport in the country at that period.

List of Champions

1918 Taça Ioduran

Below is the information about the only edition of the tournament that was actually decided on the field.

See also 

Taça Salutaris
Taça dos Campeões Estaduais

References  

Recurring sporting events established in 1917
Recurring sporting events disestablished in 1919
1917 in Brazilian football
1918 in Brazilian football
1919 in Brazilian football
Defunct football competitions in Brazil